This is a list of defunct airlines of Europe.

Albania

Armenia

Austria

Azerbaijan

Belarus

Belgium

Bosnia and Herzegovina

Bulgaria

Croatia

Cyprus

Czech Republic

Denmark

Estonia

Finland

France

Georgia

Germany

Greece

Hungary

Iceland

Ireland

Italy

Kosovo
Defunct airlines of Kosovo include;

Latvia

Lithuania

Luxembourg

Malta

Moldova

Montenegro
Defunct airlines of Montenegro include;

Nagorno-Karabakh
Defunct airlines of Nagorno-Karabakh include;

Netherlands

North Macedonia

Northern Cyprus
Defunct airlines of Northern Cyprus include;

Norway

Poland

Portugal

Romania

Russia

Serbia

Slovakia

Slovenia

Spain

Sweden

Switzerland

Turkey

Ukraine

United Kingdom

Yugoslavia

See also
 List of airlines of Europe
 Babyflot

References

Europe
 Defunct